Stoppel is a German surname. Notable people with the surname include:

 Franz Stoppel (1931–2007), Austrian chess master
 Rose Stoppel (1874–1970), German botanist and plant physiologist

German-language surnames